The Fanfani V Cabinet, led by Amintore Fanfani, was the 41st cabinet of the Italian Republic. It held office from 1982 to 1983.

The government was composed of DC, PSI, PSDI and PLI, with the external support in Parliament of the PRI.

Fanfani resigned on 29 April 1983, when, after months of tense relations in the majority, the Central Committee of the Italian Socialist Party, meeting on 22 April, decided the exit of the party from the government in order to provoke the early dissolution of the Parliament, which was in fact decreed on 4 May 1983.

Party breakdown

Ministers and other members
 Christian Democracy (DC): Prime minister, 13 ministers and 28 undersecretaries
 Italian Socialist Party (PSI): 8 ministers and 16 undersecretaries
 Italian Democratic Socialist Party (PSDI): 4 ministers and 4 undersecretaries
 Italian Liberal Party (PLI): 2 ministers and 3 undersecretaries

Composition

References

Italian governments
Cabinets established in 1982
Cabinets disestablished in 1983
1982 establishments in Italy
1983 disestablishments in Italy